Sağdıçlı can refer to:

 Sağdıçlı, Sur
 Sağdıçlı, Yüreğir